Harold Thompson Mann (December 1, 1942 – April 4, 2019) was an American competition swimmer, Olympic champion, and world record-holder.  He competed at the 1964 Summer Olympics in Tokyo, Japan, where he received a gold medal swimming for swimming the lead-off backstroke leg for the winning U.S. team in the 4×100-meter medley relay.  Mann and his relay teammates Bill Craig (breaststroke), Fred Schmidt (butterfly) and Steve Clark set a new world record of 3:58.4 – and Mann set an individual world record in the 100-meter backstroke swimming his leg (59.6 seconds).

In 1965, Mann won the national indoor and outdoor titles in both the 100 and 200 yd backstroke, setting a world's best time and American record over 100 yd. He was inducted into the International Swimming Hall of Fame in 1984, and the Virginia Sports Hall of Fame in 1988. Mann was 1960 graduate from Great Bridge High School in Chesapeake, VA, where he served as senior class president.

See also
 List of members of the International Swimming Hall of Fame
 List of Olympic medalists in swimming (men)
 List of University of North Carolina at Chapel Hill alumni
 List of University of North Carolina at Chapel Hill Olympians
 World record progression 100 metres backstroke
 World record progression 4 × 100 metres medley relay

References

1942 births
2019 deaths
American male backstroke swimmers
World record setters in swimming
North Carolina Tar Heels men's swimmers
Olympic gold medalists for the United States in swimming
Swimmers at the 1964 Summer Olympics
Medalists at the 1964 Summer Olympics
Universiade medalists in swimming
Universiade bronze medalists for the United States
Medalists at the 1965 Summer Universiade
20th-century American people
21st-century American people